Vellode Birds Sanctuary (வெள்ளோடு பறவைகள் சரணாலயம்) is an  sanctuary located in the Erode District in the state of Tamil Nadu, India. It has been designated as a protected Ramsar site since 2022.

The sanctuary is about 15 km from Erode Central Bus Terminus on the way to Chennimalai, near Vellode, and 10 km from Erode Junction Railway Station, in the south.
It is located at about 14 km from Perundurai Bus Terminus and 8 km from Perundurai railway station.
And, from Chennimalai, it is about 10 km. Management collects affordable entry fee and also provides binoculars for rent.

Bird species

It is at a large lake surrounded with semi-dark bushes, near Vellode. This  sanctuary near Erode is home to many foreign birds. The sanctuary features thousands of birds coming from various countries, some of which can be easily identified. Some easily found bird species include cormorants, teals, pintail ducks, pelicans, and darters.

Season
Villagers near this sanctuary are very much concerned about the sanctuary and the birds coming to this sanctuary, so they have taken many serious steps to avoid disturbance to the flow of birds. The best time to visit this sanctuary starts in November and continues until March. During this time birds are mostly busy in building and maintaining their nests. Many observatory towers have been built to watch these birds, around this lake.

This comes under the 'List of Protected areas of Tamil Nadu': Protected areas of Tamil Nadu

References

Bird sanctuaries of Tamil Nadu
Tourist attractions around Erode
Protected areas established in 1996
1996 establishments in Tamil Nadu
Ramsar sites in India